Kelvin Njabulo Moyo (born 3 April 1993) is a Zimbabwean footballer who plays as a center-back for Bulawayo Chiefs and the Zimbabwe national football team.

In February 2022, Zimbabwean international central defender, Kelvin Moyo joined Bulawayo Chiefs from the most successful club in Zambia, giants Nkana FC where he spend six months with them.

References

External links

1993 births
Living people
Zimbabwean footballers
Zimbabwean expatriate footballers
Zimbabwe international footballers
Association football defenders
Highlanders F.C. players
Bantu Tshintsha Guluva Rovers F.C. players
Chippa United F.C. players
Zimbabwe Premier Soccer League players
South African Premier Division players
Zimbabwean expatriate sportspeople in South Africa
Expatriate soccer players in South Africa